Presidential elections were held in Mongolia on 26 June 2017. Incumbent President Tsakhiagiin Elbegdorj, first elected in 2009 and re-elected in 2013, was constitutionally barred from running for a third term. For the first time, no candidate received a majority of the vote in the first round, forcing a run-off between Khaltmaagiin Battulga and Miyeegombyn Enkhbold on 7 July, brought forward from 9 July. The third-placed candidate Sainkhuugiin Ganbaatar refused to recognise the results after he missed out on the second round due to finishing 1,849 behind Enkhbold, claiming that an additional 35,000 votes had been added to the total and there had been fraud. His Mongolian People's Revolutionary Party demanded a recount of votes in Bayan-Ölgii.

In the second round, Battulga was narrowly elected with 50.61% of the valid votes, or 55% of the votes cast for a candidate.

Electoral system
The President of Mongolia is elected using the two-round system. Mongolia's electoral law consider the blank votes casts in presidential elections as valid votes. The General Election Commission thus includes blank votes in its calculations of the proportion of the vote won by each candidate; as a result, it is possible for no candidate to receive a majority of the vote in the second round. If this happens, the entire election is annulled and fresh elections would be held with new candidates.

Candidates
Three parties were eligible to put forward a presidential candidate; the Mongolian People's Party (MPP), the Democratic Party (DP) and the Mongolian People's Revolutionary Party (MPRP). The candidates selected are:

Miyeegombyn Enkhbold – Mongolian People's Party – MP, former Prime Minister of Mongolia (2006–2007), incumbent Speaker of the State Great Khural and current leader of the MPP
Sainkhüügiin Ganbaatar – Mongolian People's Revolutionary Party – former MP. Leader of the National Labour Party of Mongolia (Хөдөлмөрийн Үндэсний нам). 
Khaltmaagiin Battulga – Democratic Party – former MP

The MPRP had originally selected Nambaryn Enkhbayar as its candidate at a conference on 5 May. However, the Mongolian Election Commission refused to allow Enkhbayar to run as a candidate as he has an outstanding criminal record and has not spent the last five years in the country, having lived abroad from August 2013 until October 2014. As a result, the party selected Sainkhuugiin Ganbaatar as its candidate. The party's sole MP, Oktyabriin Baasankhüü, was opposed to Ganbaatar's nomination and left the party.

Use of blank vote as strategic voting
With the election being the first time a second round was needed, it became apparent the electoral law was imprecise on the rule of campaigning in between the two rounds. The lack of clear rule was interpreted by the General Commission for Elections (GCE) as an interdiction on political campaign. Sainkhüügiin Ganbaatar, who narrowly missed the second round, began a campaign calling to cast a blank vote, so as to have none of the remaining candidate reach the 50% threshold needed, leading to a new election. While not a campaign for a candidate per se, this was nonetheless ruled by the GCE as an electoral campaign, and thus forbidden. In the second round, 99,494 blank vote were gathered, totalling 8.23% of the total of valid votes, failing close to the intended result by a few thousand votes.

Results

With the blank votes being officially included Battulga passed the 50% threshold by just 7,333 votes (50.61%).

By area
First round

Second round

Notes

References

2017 in Mongolia
Mongolia
June 2017 events in Asia
Presidential elections in Mongolia